Skyler Anna Shaye (born October 14, 1986) is an American actress. She is best known for her role as Kylie in Superbabies: Baby Geniuses 2 (2004) and as Cloe in Bratz: The Movie (2007).

Early life 
Skyler Anna Shaye was born on October 14, 1986, to actress and country singer Bonnie Paul and entrepreneur Stanley Shuster in Los Angeles, California. She is the niece of director Stuart Paul and film producer Steven Paul. She was emancipated at the age of 15.

Career

Career beginnings
Shaye began her career as a child actress and landed her first role in The Tin Soldier (1998), a television film directed by her godfather, actor Jon Voight. She had a recurring role as Sutton Ramsey in The WB's comedy series Family Affair. In 2005, she portrayed Katie Bryce in ABC's medical drama series Grey's Anatomy in the episode "A Hard Day's Night". She reprised her role as Katie Bryce in the series for two more episodes in 2016 and 2019. In 2006, she had guest roles in Criminal Minds and Veronica Mars. Shaye landed the role of Cloe in comedy film Bratz (2007), based on the Bratz line of dolls. She stated in an interview with American Cheerleader that "Cloe is a great soccer player, but she's doing it so that she can get a college scholarship. Deep down, she wants to be a filmmaker, and she never puts down her video camera. [In real life] I'm very athletic and love to run, hike and dance." She played one of the main roles alongside Nathalia Ramos, Logan Browning, and Janel Parrish. She also provided her voice for the Bratz 4 Real video game.

Beside The Tin Soldier (1998), alongside Jon Voight she played Lulu in Deadly Lessons (2006), Megan in Beyond (2012),  Cindy in Showtime original series Ray Donovan (2015), and Lynn Landsburg in two Hallmark Movies & Mysteries original films JL Ranch (2016) and JL Family Ranch: The Wedding Gift (2020).

Personal life
Shaye started dating musician Christian Lopez in 2017. They married on October 10, 2022.

Filmography

References

External links 
 
 

Actresses from Los Angeles
21st-century American actresses
American child actresses
American film actresses
American television actresses
Living people
1986 births